Armand Duka (born 7 October 1962) is head of the Albanian Football Association (FShF). His first role in football was being owner of Erzeni Shijak.

Duka, a businessman and graduate of economics from Tirana University, has been president of the FShF since 2002

On 1 March 2014 Armand signed a new four-year contract to stay as president of the Football Association of Albania.

References

1962 births
Living people
People from Shijak
University of Tirana alumni
Football people in Albania